Jaroslav Bulant and Richard Vogel were the defending champions, having won the last edition held as a Challenger tournament. They did not participate in 1990.Todd Woodbridge and Simon Youl won the title, defeating Paul Haarhuis and Mark Koevermans 6–3, 6–1, in the final.

Seeds

  Tomás Carbonell /  Carlos Costa (quarterfinals)
  Josef Čihák /  Cyril Suk (quarterfinals)
  Paul Haarhuis /  Mark Koevermans (final)
  Per Henricsson /  Nicklas Utgren (quarterfinals)

Draw

Draw

References
General

Doubles